= TenPages.com =

Dutch Website for Books

Tenpages.com
- Website type: Crowd funding
- Available in: Dutch
- Dissolved: February 2014
- Headquarters: {{{location_country}}}
- Website: www.tenpages.com
- Commercial: Yes
- Launched: February 2010

Tenpages.com was a Dutch website for crowdfunding investments in books. Authors post at least 10 pages of a book they want sponsored. Investors buy shares in the book. If a book meets its funding goal, it is published. The writers get 10–20 percent royalties and the investors get 10 percent of total sales.

It was founded by Valentine van der Lande in February 2010.

On February 7, 2014, tenpages.com announced on its website that it has stopped all activities.

== See also ==
- Comparison of crowd funding services
